Vincent Dupuis (22 January 1889 – 11 May 1967) was a Liberal party member of the House of Commons of Canada and a Senator. He was born in Saint-Philippe-de-Laprairie, Quebec and became a lawyer by career.

Dupuis attended normal school, then junior college at Montreal, then McGill University. He became registrar of Laprairie County, and was appointed King's Counsel.

He was first elected to Parliament at the Laprairie—Napierville riding in a by-election on 22 July 1929 then re-elected there for a full term in the 1930 election. When his riding was disbanded in 1933, Dupuis sought re-election at Chambly—Rouville in the 1935 election and won. He was re-elected for one final House of Commons term in 1940. In 1945, Dupuis was appointed to the Senate and held that post until his death on 11 May 1967.

From 1928 to 1930, Dupuis had also served as a municipal councillor of Laprairie, Quebec.

References

External links
 

1889 births
1967 deaths
Liberal Party of Canada MPs
Members of the House of Commons of Canada from Quebec
Canadian senators from Quebec
Liberal Party of Canada senators
McGill University alumni
Lawyers in Quebec
Quebec municipal councillors
People from Montérégie
Canadian King's Counsel